In economics, wage dispersion is the variation in wages encountered in an economy.

See also
Search theory
Price dispersion
Economic inequality
Wage ratio

Books
  Dale T. Mortensen (2005), Wage Dispersion: Why Are Similar Workers Paid Differently?, MIT Press.  

Dispersion
Income inequality metrics

de:Lohnspreizung